Anto may either be a surname or given name. It is a Croatian diminutive form of Anton, Antonio and Antonijo that is used in Croatia. It is common in Ireland as a short version of Anthony.

Given name
Anto Antony (born 1956), Indian politician
Anto Đapić (born 1958), Croatian politician
Anto Drobnjak (born 1968), Montenegrin football player
Anto Grabo (born 1960), Bosnian football player
Anto Gvozdenović (1853–1935), Montenegrin military commander, politician and diplomat
Anto Jakovljević (born 1962), Croatian football player
Anto Kovačević (born 1952), Croatian politician
M. Anto Peter (1967–2012), computer scientist and technical writer
Anto Raukas (1935–2021), Estonian geologist 
Anthony "Anto" Thistlethwaite (born 1955), British musician
Anto Kankaras, fictional character from Far Cry

Surname
Rino Anto, Indian footballer

See also

Ant (name)
Antão, name
Anth (name)
Antto (disambiguation)

Notes

Estonian masculine given names
Croatian masculine given names